Ironto is an unincorporated community in Montgomery County, Virginia, United States.

References

Unincorporated communities in Montgomery County, Virginia
Unincorporated communities in Virginia